Koziebrody  is a village in the administrative district of Gmina Raciąż, within Płońsk County, Masovian Voivodeship, in east-central Poland.

The History of Koziebrody, Poland: 1373-1973,  by Prof. John Kneski

References

Koziebrody